is a Japanese television drama series that first aired on TBS in 1971.

Cast
 Yuki Okazaki
 Sei Hiraizumi
 Jun Tazaki
 Haruko Kato
 Mitsuo Hamada

References

External links
 

1971 Japanese television series debuts
1972 Japanese television series endings
Japanese drama television series
TBS Television (Japan) dramas